Ruff is an unincorporated community in Grant County, in the U.S. state of Washington.

History
Ruff was platted in 1910 when the railroad was extended to that point. The community was named in honor of Godfried Ruff, a German settler. A post office was established at Ruff in 1911, and remained in operation until 1954.

References

Unincorporated communities in Grant County, Washington
Unincorporated communities in Washington (state)